This is a list of the Flags of the Sri Lankan Provinces. Provincial flags for the modern provinces of Sri Lanka were first introduced in 1987, and 1988 for the North Eastern Province, which was at the time one entity. In 2007 with the separation of the North Eastern Province, into the Northern and the Eastern provinces, two new flags were adopted.

Most of the flags are based upon ancient Sinhalese flags, and or symbols for their respective regions.

Current provincial flags

Historic provincial flags

See also
 List of Sri Lankan flags

References

 
Sri Lanka

Flags of country subdivisions
Sri Lanka geography-related lists